Kiss is a book for teenage readers, written by Jacqueline Wilson and illustrated by Nick Sharratt. It was published 2007 by Doubleday. The book revolves around a girl called Sylvie whose childhood friend Carl is struggling to come to terms with his sexuality.

Plot summary
Sylvie and Carl have been friends since they were little. They have called themselves boyfriend and girlfriend since they were small and Sylvie has always believed they would end up married. As they start high school, Carl drifts further and further away from Sylvie. One day, she wanders into the girls' bathrooms and finds Miranda, the most popular girl in school, there. Miranda asks Sylvie to go to her party after finding out about Sylvie's "boyfriend", whom she has taken a shine to, even though they haven't met. Sylvie accepts and then asks Carl about it, hoping that he will not go. To her dismay, Carl is eager to go and they meet Miranda and her friends. They play a game of Spin The Bottle and Sylvie wishes to be kissed by Carl. Unfortunately, he does not kiss her (but to Sylvie's surprise he kisses Miranda) and Sylvie realises that his feelings have changed. Carl invites Miranda, Sylvie and a boy called Paul to go bowling with him. Sylvie does not like Paul and is surprised when Carl tells Sylvie that he wanted to impress Paul by bowling.
 
On Carl's birthday, Miranda, Paul, Sylvie and Carl go to Kew Gardens since Carl is obsessed with glass. They all get lost while playing hide-and-seek. Miranda and Paul went on the train so Carl and Sylvie go with Carl's mother, Jules. Carl refused to see anyone after that night and later tells Sylvie that he is gay. Sylvie then finds out that Carl had found Paul during hide-and-seek and kissed him. Paul kissed him back for a moment 'like he really cared about [Carl]', but then pushed him away, claiming Carl is a pervert. Carl gets teased and picked on at school.
 
Later, Sylvie goes to find Carl and sees the Glass Hut (where Carl keeps his glass collection) is ruined with glass everywhere. Sylvie gets cut and tells Jules, Mick (Carl's father) and Jake (Carl's older brother) about the Glass Hut. They see Carl in the bushes all cut from smashing all the glass. He cut all his fingers and wrist and needed many stitches. Carl comes out to his mother at the hospital (when asked why he smashed the glass) and she tells him she has no problem with him being gay.
 
Miranda and Sylvie bunk off school to meet Carl in McDonald's for lunch, and after hearing about how he is being bullied at school, Miranda persuades Sylvie to meet Carl after school, impressing all the boys who see them.
 
In the Glass Hut, Carl and Sylvie see all the damage. Sylvie thinks that Carl will not feel the same about her. Carl kisses her and says he will always love her, platonically. Sylvie states that it wasn't the kiss she was hoping for but is still satisfied.

Character Summary

Main

 Sylvie West: Sylvie is very small for her age. She has long mousy feathered hair, dresses the are raspberry, she attends Milstead Secondary School, where she is not so popular, and is looked on as someone not to be taken seriously. Most of the students call her 'Titch', even Miranda. She only really spends time with one person: a shy, boring girl named Lucy. She is deeply in love with her best friend Carl Johnson, who lives next door to her, and whom she has known since they were born. She lives with her mother and an old lodger named Miss Miles.
 Carl Johnson: Carl is Sylvie's best friend and next door neighbour, the son of Julia and Michael Johnson, and the younger brother of Jake by two years. He is very good looking, with blond hair that flops over his brow and brown eyes, and he is very intelligent. He has a love of all things glass, ever since his great aunt Esther gave him the Glass Boy as a present when he was five. He goes to Kingmere Grammar School, in Year Nine. Far less masculine than both his father or brother, he is often quiet and subdued and can have strong bouts of depression. He is revealed to be gay, and he has a crush on Paul. However, he still loves Sylvie, platonically.
 Miranda Holbein: Miranda is charismatic, confident and very full-on. Although not very pretty, she has something enchanting about her.  Although she is only in Year Nine at Milstead Secondary School, she possesses a high degree of sexiness, wearing a lot of make-up and gaudy, revealing clothes, and is desired by many boys. Miranda is one of Sylvie's closest friends. She also fancies Carl and wants him to be her boyfriend and talks often about him.
 Paul: Paul is Carl's new best friend, who is extremely good at football and good looking. He attends Kingsmere Grammar School with Carl and Raj. He is not a good friend to Carl, as he takes advantage of both Carl and Miranda. When he finds out that Carl loves him (when Carl tries to kiss him), he starts bullying him and calls him a pervert. Despite this, when Carl talks about kissing him he says that Paul kissed him back for moment like he really cared about Carl, suggesting he may be confused about his sexuality.
 Jake Johnson: Jake is the eldest son of Julia and Michael Johnson. He is sixteen, in Year Eleven at Milstead Secondary School. He is not as intelligent as Carl, and does not look a bit like him (he has dark untidy hair and very dark eyes, and he is at least six foot tall). He plays the guitar, and later starts up a band, although he is not a good singer. At the end of the book, he reveals he has a crush on Sylvie.

Minor

 Lucy: Lucy is shy, very innocent and well behaved. Lucy is one of Sylvie's only friends at school. However, deep down Sylvie has only ever been using Lucy to fill the gap left by the absence of Carl, who attends a different school. She is mad about chocolate, wants to be a nurse when she grows up, loves pop bands and has a strict mother. Carl doesn't like Lucy, and added her name whenever he thought something was silly, twee or naff. He said things like: "It's too Lucy for words", "It's a bit Lucy isn't it?" and "It makes you look Lucyfied." Eventually, Sylvie didn't like Lucy any more, because she thought that Lucy was too babyish. She is boring and prim and often condescending.
 Sylvie's mother: She is Sylvie's mother and is also Gerry's girlfriend. She often worries about her daughter, Sylvie, and often says she wants to cancel her dates with Gerry for her. Unlike most, Sylvie's mum believes that Sylvie and Carl will never fall in love. She has home-dyed hair and is fat.
 Julia 'Jules' Johnson: Jules is the mother of Jake and Carl, and the wife of Mick. Kind and warm, she worries about her son Carl, and always believed he was gay and has no problem about it.
 Michael 'Mick' Johnson: Mick is the father of Jake and Carl, and the husband of Jules. When he finds out Carl is gay, he tries to be supportive, but says he may be going through a phase. He works as a lecturer at the local university.
 Miss Miles: Miss Miles is Sylvie and Sylvie's Mum's lodger who is in her seventies. Miss Miles is an old woman who didn't marry. She loves to read Charles Dickens and quotes him often. Sylvie and her mum don't always know she's quoting him until she says "as the great man says". She is very insecure, and is like a grandmother to Sylvie.
 Gerry: Gerry is Sylvie's mother's boyfriend who she meets in a fictional community forum named "Not Waving But Drowning" after the Stevie Smith poem of the same name. He had a stroke two years ago rendering him physically disabled. He walks with the aid of a cane as he has a bad limp. Sylvie does not particularly like Gerry, thinking of him as dull and boring, and cannot see her mother's attraction to him.
 Alice: Alice has cream-blonde waist-length hair, very pale skin and she is very slim. She attends the party at Miranda's and the cake making. She is Miranda's best friend from her old school, and she does not like how Miranda is growing closer to Sylvie.
 Raj: Goes to Carl's school and is of Asian heritage. He is a friend of Miranda and attends Kingsmere Grammar School. He attends Miranda's party. He used to go out with her, but Raj's parents disapproved of Miranda, so they split up. Near the end of the book, it is shown that he likes Carl, as he sends a text to Miranda saying how Carl is now being bullied for trying to kiss Paul, and offers to beat the bullies up.
 Andy: Andy is a black youth and very good looking. He is one of Miranda's friends. He kisses Alice and Sylvie in the Spin the Bottle game.

References

External links
 Kids at Random House: Book Details for Kiss

2007 British novels
British young adult novels
Novels by Jacqueline Wilson
Doubleday (publisher) books
Sexuality in fiction
Gay male teen fiction